is a village located in Nagano Prefecture, Japan. , the village had an estimated population of 2,914 in 1251 households, and a population density of 11 persons per km².

Geography
Otari is located in the mountainous far northwestern Nagano Prefecture, bordered by Niigata Prefecture to the north and west. Much of the village is within the borders of the Chūbu-Sangaku National Park or the Myōkō-Togakushi Renzan National Park.

Surrounding municipalities
Nagano Prefecture
 Nagano
 Hakuba
Niigata Prefecture
 Itoigawa
 Myōkō

Climate
The village has a climate characterized by hot and humid summers, and cold winters (Köppen climate classification Cfa).  The average annual temperature in Otari is 10.4 °C. The average annual rainfall is 1420 mm with September as the wettest month. The temperatures are highest on average in August, at around 23.7 °C, and lowest in January, at around -2.1 °C.

Demographics
Per Japanese census data, the population of Otari has decreased considerably over the past 70 years.

History
The area of present-day Otari was part of ancient Shinano Province and was part of the territory controlled by Matsumoto Domain under the Tokugawa shogunate of the Edo period. The modern village of Otari was established on April 1, 1954 by the merger of the villages of Minami-Otari, Kita-Otari and Nakatsuchi.

Education
Otari has one public elementary school and one public middle school operated by the village government. The village does not have a high school.

Transportation

Railway
 East Japan Railway Company – Ōito Line
  -  - 
 West Japan Railway Company – Ōito Line
  -  -

Highway

International relations
 – Marlborough, New Zealand, sister city since January 16, 1991
 - Ottery St. Mary, Devon, United Kingdom, friendship city since May 4, 1992

References

External links
 
Official Website 

 
Villages in Nagano Prefecture